Konrad Hubert Michalak (born 19 September 1997) is a Polish professional footballer who plays as a midfielder for Turkish club Konyaspor.

Club career
Michalak started his career with Czarni Żagań, but joined UKP Zielona Góra in 2009 with a teammate from Czarni. He spent high school at a boarding school, where he and his roommate were two of the only Legia supporters, and would commute to training with UKP.

In 2013, Michalak joined boyhood club Legia Warsaw, and spent three years with the reserves, before making his debut in December 2016, coming on as an 82nd-minute substitute for Nemanja Nikolić.

On 10 February 2017, Michalak officially joined Zagłębie Sosnowiec on a 6-month loan deal.

On 5 August 2017, he was loaned to Wisła Płock.

On 3 June 2019, he signed a four-year contract with the Russian Premier League club FC Akhmat Grozny. On 31 January 2020, Akhmat announced he joined Turkish team Ankaragücü on loan until the end of the season. On 24 August 2020, he moved on loan to another Turkish club Çaykur Rizespor. On 17 August 2021, he was loaned to Konyaspor for the 2021–22 season.

International career
Michalak was first called up to the Poland under 20 side in September 2016, and scored on his debut against Switzerland. He was called up again in March 2017 for a friendly game against Italy. Because of his call up, which coincided with call-ups for teammates Sebastian Milewski and Robert Bartczak, his club side, Sosnowiec's game against Górnik Zabrze had to be postponed as Sosnowiec would not have had enough fit senior players.

He was called up to the senior Poland squad for a friendly match with Scotland on 24 March 2022 and the 2022 FIFA World Cup qualification playoff against Sweden on 29 March 2022.

Career statistics

Club

Notes

Honours
Lechia Gdańsk
Polish Cup: 2018–19

References

External links
 Profile at UEFA

Living people
1997 births
People from Szprotawa
Polish footballers
Poland youth international footballers
Poland under-21 international footballers
Association football midfielders
Lechia Gdańsk players
Legia Warsaw players
Zagłębie Sosnowiec players
Wisła Płock players
FC Akhmat Grozny players
MKE Ankaragücü footballers
Çaykur Rizespor footballers
Konyaspor footballers
Ekstraklasa players
Russian Premier League players
Süper Lig players
Polish expatriate footballers
Expatriate footballers in Russia
Expatriate footballers in Turkey